The phonology of second languages is different from the phonology of first languages in various ways. The differences are considered to come from general characteristics of second languages, such as slower speech rate, lower proficiency than native speakers, and from the interaction between non-native speakers' first and second languages.

Research on second-language phonology has been done not only on segments, but also on prosody. Second-language prosody, like second-language segments, has been studied in terms of both its global characteristics and the interactions between first languages and second languages.

First language to second language

Global second-language prosody characteristics

Speech rate 
L2 speech rate is typically slower than native speech. For example, Mandarin Chinese speakers’ speech rate in an English utterance is slower than native English speakers’ speech rate (Derwing and Munro, 1995), and speech rates in a sentence by highly experienced Italian and Korean nonnative speakers of English are slower than that of native English speakers' (Guion et al., 2000). In this study, the main factor of the slower speech rate for the Italian and Korean accented English was the durations of the vowels and sonorant consonants (Guion et al., 2000). Another source of the slower speech rate in L2 speech is that L2 speakers tend to not reduce function words, such as "the" or "and," as much as native speakers (Aoyama and Guion, 2007). The generally slower speech rate in L2 speech is correlated with the degree of perceived foreign accent by native listeners (Derwing and Munro, 1997).

Interaction between first- and second-language prosody 

L2 speech is influenced by the speaker's L1 background. Such influences have been explored in relation to many prosodic features, such as pitch perception and pitch excursion (Beckman, 1986; Aoyama and Guion, 2007), stress placement (Archibald, 1995, 1998a, 1998b; Flege and Bohn, 1989; Archibald, 1997), syllable structure (Broselow and Park, 1995; Broslow, 1988; Eckman, 1991), and tone (Sereno and Wang, 2007; Guion and Pederson, 2007).

Pitch perception and pitch excursions 

When perceiving accented syllables in English, Japanese nonnative speakers of English tend to rely only on F0, or pitch of the accented syllables, while native speakers use F0, duration, and amplitude (Beckman, 1986). This finding was confirmed in production, by showing that the excursions of F0 of English content words were larger for Japanese nonnative speakers of English than for native English speakers (Aoyama and Guion, 2007).

In both studies, the reason for this phenomenon was proposed to be related to the characteristics of the nonnative speakers’ L1, Japanese. Japanese is a mora-timed language, and because of this, longer syllable duration makes a phonological difference in Japanese. Therefore, when expressing stress in Japanese, Japanese speakers may rely more on F0 than duration, which is a critical cue for a different phonological distinction. This L1 characteristic might interfere with Japanese speakers’ perception and production of English, which is a stress-timed language and might be free of such durational restrictions.

Stress placement on words 

Influence from L1 to L2 was also found in stress placement on words. Hungarian learners of English tend to place initial stress on English words that do not have initial stress, because Hungarian has fixed initial stress and this is transferred to Hungarian speakers' L2 English prosody (Archibald, 1995; 1998a; 1998b). Spanish speakers of English were found not to stress target stressed syllables in English, and this might be due to the lack of stress in Spanish cognates and the lexical similarity between Spanish and English words (Flege and Bohn, 1989). In addition, it is suggested that speakers of  tone languages (e.g., Chinese) and pitch-accent languages (e.g., Japanese), both of which use pitch as a phonologically meaningful item, do not compute stress placement in English, but rather store the stress information lexically (Archibald, 1997).

Syllable structure 

L2 speakers can also perceive some innate characteristics of the L2, which lead to different repair strategies for different phonological patterns. Korean L2 speakers of English add an extra final vowel to some English words but not to all (Broslow and Park, 1995), as in (1).

(1) Korean pronunciations of English words 

The problem is that modern Korean does not have a phonological vowel length difference, and Korean speakers show their own repair mechanism for English minimal pairs that have tense/lax difference, by adding an extra final vowel to English words with tense vowels. This might be because Korean learners of English attempt to preserve the mora count of the original English word, by adding an extra final vowel to words that have two moras (Broslow and Park, 1995). The syllable structure of such a word might look like in (2)

(2)  Syllable structure of English “beat” by Korean nonnative speakers of English (adapted from Broslow and Park, 1995).

Tone: second-language perception, production, and learning 
L2 listeners show different patterns of tone perception in tone languages, such as Mandarin Chinese. In Guion and Pederson (2007), native listeners of Mandarin judged the similarity of synthesized Mandarin tones on the basis of both F0 and F0 slope, while English and Japanese listeners used only F0, not F0 slope. However, it was also observed that late learners of Mandarin showed similar patterns of tone perception as native listeners of Mandarin, focusing on both F0 and F0 slope of the tones. This suggests that L2 learners can learn to attend to the cues that L1 speakers use for the tone distinction.

The possibility of learning new L2 prosodic distinction was further explored in a training study on Mandarin tones (Sereno and Wang, 2007). English L2 listeners’ perception and production of Mandarin tones improved after perceptual training, and this was observed both behaviorally and cortically: L2 listeners’ accuracy of tone perception and production improved, and increased activity of language areas in the left hemisphere (superior temporal gyrus) and neighboring effects on relevant neural areas were observed.

Intonation 
Dutch English
Willems (1982): size and direction of pitch movements
Korean and Mandarin Englishes
McGory (1997): nonnatives put pitch accents both on prominent and less prominent words, f0 patterns of statements and questions indistinct, different L1 backgrounds showed different error patterns

Second language to first language 
Phonetic Realization of Phonological Intonation
Dutch Greek
Ineke Mennen (2004): Both L1 and L2 influence each other in terms of phonetic realization of phonological intonation.

Teaching second language pronunciation 
Before the popularity of communicative teaching methods in the late 70s, pronunciation teaching through audio-lingual method (ALM) had a central place in language education. This emphasis shifted in the late 70's when the prevalent obsession with aural-oral drills, native-like accuracy, consonant pair repetition and the centrality of pronunciation was replaced by a concern for meaningful communication. For nearly a decade, it was assumed that listening to language was enough to develop pronunciation. This concern again saw a shift in the late 80's when pronunciation again found a place in desired language teaching outcomes due to an increased need to develop L2 learners' pronunciation of the second language. In the 80's and 90's seminal pedagogical texts written by Judy Gilbert and Celce-Murcia paved the path for a more interactive and meaningful way of teaching pronunciation in the 21st century. These approaches are a combination of audio-lingual and communicative methods, have still retained the minimum pair drill format, but there is increased emphasis on interaction and also suprasegmental features such as stress, intonation and rhythm.

References

Notes

Bibliography 

 Aoyama, K. & Guion, S. G. (2007). Prosody in second language acquisition: Acoustic Analyses of duration and F0 range. In * * * Bohn, O.-S. & Munro, M. J. (Eds.), Language experience in second language speech learning: In honor of James Emil Flege (pp. 282–297). Amsterdam: John Benjamins.
 Archibald, J. (1995). The acquisition of stress. In J. Archibald (Ed.), Phonological acquisition and phonological theory (pp. 81–109). Hillsdale, NJ: Lawrence Erlbaum.
 Archibald, J. (1997). The acquisition of English stress by speakers of tone languages: Lexical storage versus computation. Linguistics, 35, 167–181.
 Archibald, J. (1998a). Metrical parameters and lexical dependency: Acquiring L2 stress. In S. Flynn & G. Martohardjono (eds.), The generative study of second language acquisition (Vol. 14, pp. 279–301). Mahwah, NJ: Lawrence Erlbaum.
 Archibald, L. (1998b) Second language phonology. Amsterdam: John Benjamins.
 Beckman, M. E. (1986). Stress and non-stress accent. Dordrecht, Holland: Foris.
 Best, C. T. (1995). A direct realist view of cross-language speech perception. In W. Strange (Ed.), Speech perception and linguistic experience: Issues in cross-language research (pp. 171–204). Timonium, MD: York Press. 
 Broselow, E., & Park, H.-B. (1995). Mora conservation in second language prosody. In J. Archibald (Ed.), Phonological acquisition and phonological theory (pp. 81–109). Hillsdale, NJ: Lawrence Erlbaum.* 
 Derwing, T. M., & Munro, M. J. (1997). Accent, intelligibility, and comprehensibility: Evidence from four L1s. Studies in Second Language Acquisition, 19, 1-16. 
 Eckman, F. (1991). The structural conformity hypothesis and the acquisition of consonant clusters in the interlanguage of ESL learners. Studies in Second Language Acquisition, 13, 23–41.
 Flege, J. E. (1991). Age of learning affects the authenticity of voice-onset time (VOT) in stop consonants produced in a second language. Journal of the Acoustical society of America, 89, 395–411.
 Flege, J. E., & Bohn, O.-S. (1989). An instrumental study of vowel reduction and stress placement in Spanish-accented English. Studies in Second Language Acquisition, 11, 35–62.
 Guion, S. G. & Pederson, E. (2007). Investigating the role of attention in phonetic learning. In Bohn, O.-S. & Munro, M. J. (Eds.), Language experience in second language speech learning: In honor of James Emil Flege (pp. 57–78). Amsterdam: John Benjamins.
 Guion, S. G., Flege, J. E., Liu, S. H., & Yeni-Komshian, G. H. (2000). Age of learning effects on the duration of sentences produced in a second language. Applied Psycholinguistics, 21, 205–228.
 Kuhl, P. K. (1991). Human adults and human infants show a “perceptual magnet effect” for the prototypes of speech categories, monkeys do not. perception & Psychophysics, 50, 93-107.
 Magen, I. (1998). The perception of foreign-accented speech. Journal of Phonetics, 26, 381–400.
 McGory, J. T. (1997). Acquisition of intonational prominence in English by Seoul Korean and Mandarin Chinese speakers. Unpublished Ph.D., Ohio State University.
 Mennen, I. (2004). Bi-directional interference in the intonation of Dutch speakers of Greek.  Journal of Phonetics, 32, 543–563.
 Munro, M. J., & Derwing, T. M. (1995). Processing time, accent, and comprehensibility in the perception of native and foreign-accented speech. Language and Speech, 38, 289–306.
 Sereno, J. A. & Wang, Y. (2007). Behavioral and cortical effects of learning a second language: The acquisition of tone. In Bohn, O.-S. & Munro, M. J. (Eds.), Language experience in second language speech learning: In honor of James Emil Flege (pp. 241–258). Amsterdam: John Benjamins.

Phonology
Second-language acquisition